Pircher is a surname. Notable people with the surname include:

Gerhard Pircher, Austrian luger
 Josef Pircher, founder of Pircher Oberland
Marc Pircher, musician
Olga Pircher (born 1952), Austrian politician
Patrick Pircher (born 1982), Austrian footballer

See also
Bircher (surname)
Pitcher (surname)
Surnames of South Tyrolean origin
Surnames of Austrian origin

German toponymic surnames